The Zhyngyldyozek is a river in Kazakhstan.

The river flows from the Ulytau District, Karaganda Region into the Yrgyz District, Aktobe Region. Zhyngyldyozek flows across desolate areas, Koskol village is located close to the Shubarteniz, near the outflowing point of the river. The basin of the river is a seasonal grazing ground for local cattle. The name means "trees in the desert" in the Kazakh language.

Course  
The Zhyngyldyozek has its source at the Shubarteniz salt lake. The river flows first roughly northwestwards across dry steppe and semi-desert territory where there is almost no surface runoff. In its last stretch, as it nears the Shalkarteniz, it bends and heads roughly northwards in an area of solonchak soil. Finally it flows across salt marshes into the eastern shore of Shalkarteniz, an endorheic salt lake at the southern end of the Turgay Basin.

In the upper and middle reaches the river valley is a drainless depression. The bed of the Zhyngyldyozek is unbranched, underdeveloped, and tends to break up erratically into pools along its entire length.

Tributaries
The Zhyngyldyozek has six tributaries. Its main food is snow. It has a steady water flow only for about one or two months, during the melting of the snows in the spring, when the depth of the river may reach  in places. Except during the spring floods, the water of the Zhyngyldyozek is generally bittern-salty, even in years of abundant snowfall.

See also
List of rivers of Kazakhstan

References

External links
ЖЫНГЫЛДЫОЗЕК @ e-history.kz

Rivers of Kazakhstan
Geography of Aktobe Region
Geography of Karaganda Region
Shalkarteniz basin